Zbyněk Fiala (born 12 July 1964) is a Czech former cyclist. He competed in the team pursuit event at the 1988 Summer Olympics.

References

External links
 

1964 births
Living people
Czech male cyclists
Olympic cyclists of Czechoslovakia
Cyclists at the 1988 Summer Olympics
People from Louny
Sportspeople from the Ústí nad Labem Region